The Nilgiri langur (Semnopithecus johnii) is a langur (a type of Old World monkey) . This primate has glossy black fur on its body and golden brown fur on its head. It is similar in size and long-tailed like the gray langurs. Females have a white patch of fur on the inner thigh. It typically lives in troops of nine to ten monkeys. Its diet consists of fruits, shoots and leaves. The species is classified as vulnerable due to habitat destruction and poaching for its fur and flesh, the latter believed to have aphrodisiac properties.

Taxonomy and Classification
The classification of the Nilgiri langur has been disputed.  Traditionally it has been placed within the genus Trachypithecus based on morphological similarities such as cranial morphology and neonatal pelage color, and within the Trachypithecus vetulus group within Trachypithecus based on a presumed close relationship with the purple-faced langur, which had been classified as Trachypithecus vetulus.  DNA and other evidence suggests that the Nilgiri langur and purple-faced langur are more closely related to the gray langurs and have thus been reclassified within the genus Semnopithecus.

Distribution
Found in the Nilgiri Hills of the Western Ghats in South India. Its range also includes Kodagu in Karnataka, Kodayar Hills in Tamil Nadu, and many other hilly areas in Kerala and Tamil Nadu. It is also found in Silent Valley National Park of Kerala.

Description
The head-plus-body length is 78–80 cm in adult males and 58–60 cm in adult females, with the tail adding between 68.5 and 96.5 cm. The males weigh 9.1-14.8 kg, the females 10.9–12 kg. The gestation period is not precisely known but assumed to be similar to the closely related Hanuman Langur, i.e. 200 days.

References

External links

ARKive - images and movies of the Nilgiri langur (Semnopithecus johnii)

Nilgiri langur
Primates of South Asia
Monkeys in India
Fauna of Tamil Nadu
Mammals of India
Fauna of the Western Ghats
Endemic fauna of the Western Ghats
Vulnerable fauna of Asia
Nilgiri langur
Nilgiri langur